Smagul Abatuly Yelubay (Smağūl Abatūly Elubai) (born 9 March 1947) is a Kazakh writer and scriptwriter. He serves as a Secretary of Writers' Union of Kazakhstan.

Life
Smagul Yelubayev was born on 9 March 1947 in Chardzhou, Turkmenistan. In 1961 his family moved to Almaty, Kazakhstan. 
1971 graduated from Kazakh State University;
1975 graduated from High Courses for Scriptwriters and Film Directors;
1976-1992 worked as a Deputy Editor-in-Chief at Kazakhfilm;
1992-1995 worked as an Editor-in-Chief at Parasat magazine;
1995-2004 worked as a journalist at Radio Free Europe/Radio Liberty, Prague, Czech Republic;
2008-2010 worked as an Editor-in-Chief at Kazakhfilm;
 From 2010 professor at Kazakh National Academy of Arts.

Literary works
«Ойсыл-Қара» (1972), Almaty;
«Саттар соқпағы» (1974), Almaty;
«Жарық дүние» (1978), Almaty;
«На свете белом» (1982), Moscow;
«Ақ боз үй» (1990), novel, Almaty, republished several times;
«Одинокая юрта» («Ақ боз үй»), Almaty, 1992. The novel trilogy about the famine of 1937 in Kazakhstan and the repressions of 1937 (Part 1. "The Lonely Yurt" (1984, manuscript), part 2. "Prayer" (Молитва) (1986, manuscript), part 3. «Mortal coil» (Бренный мир) (1999, manuscript);
«Молитва» (1992), novel, Almaty
«Бренный мир» (2000), novel, Almaty
«Век страшного суда» («Қиямет-қайым ғасыры», book for doubters) (2011)
Lonely Yurt  («Одинокая юрта») in English published by Kazakh Pen Club in USA, which received the nomination "Book of the week" on Amazon.com in November 2016.
«Ақ боз үй» (2017), collection of works in 2 volumes;
«Arasat meidany» (2017) («Одинокая юрта») in Turkish, Ankara, Turkey;
«Una Yurta Solitaria» (2018) («Одинокая юрта») in Spanish, Madrid, Spain.

Filmography
Scriptwriter
1982 — Red Yurt («Красная юрта»)
1983 — Atone («Искупи вину»)
1983 — House under the loon («Дом под луной»)
1991 — Surzhekey - The Angel of Death («Суржекей — ангел смерти»), Grand-Prize in the Silver Crescent Film Festival, Ashkhabad ( 1991), Grand-Prize in the Bastau Film Festival, Almaty (1993)
1992 — Batyr Bayan («Батыр Баян»)
2004 — Revenge («Кек»)
2012 — The Hunter Boy («Аңшы бала»), Best Foreign Drama Award in International Family Film Festival in Hollywood
2016 — Diamond sword («Алмазный меч»)
2016 — Land of Kazakhs («Қазақ елі»)
2016 — Oasis («Оазис»)
2018 — «Бала гашыктык»

Awards
Order of Kurmet (2005) 
PEN Club's Award (2012)
State scholarship in the field of culture (2015), (2016)
By the decree of the President of the Republic of Kazakhstan for outstanding achievements in the Kazakh literature and culture, he was awarded the "Order of Parasat" (December 5, 2018)

References

Living people
Al-Farabi Kazakh National University alumni
1947 births
People from Türkmenabat
Turkmenistan emigrants to Kazakhstan
Kazakh-language writers
Kazakhstani male writers
Kazakhstani short story writers
Male short story writers
Kazakhstani novelists
Soviet novelists
Male novelists
20th-century male writers